Barrigada is a village in the United States territory of Guam. A largely residential municipality, its main village is located south of the Antonio B. Won Pat International Airport near the intersections of Routes 8, 10, and 16.  The community east of the airport known as Barrigada Heights is considered an affluent neighborhood on the island, where homes have excellent views overlooking much of Guam including the island's airport and hotels along Tumon Bay. Another significant location is Mount Barrigada, nearly 200 meters above sea level. Its location in the center of the island means it houses most of the island's radio masts and towers; the position and height make it easier for radio signals to reach the entire island.

History
From 2 to 4 August 1944, the United States Marine Corps engaged troops from the Empire of Japan at present-day Barrigada Heights during the battle of Guam, a year before the end of the Second World War. When the Japanese line collapsed, American forces pursued them to the north, winning the battle. In recent years, the three main highways in Barrigada have been renamed in honor of the U.S. Military. Route 8 is designated Purple Heart Memorial Highway; Route 10 is designated Vietnam Veterans Highway; and Route 16 is designated Army Drive.

Tiyan (Former NAS Agana) 
North of Routes 8 and 16 is the former Naval Air Station Agana, most of which lies within the boundary of Barrigada. When NAS Agana (now Antonio B. Won Pat International Airport) was closed in the mid-1990s, the land and buildings were handed over to the Government of Guam, which utilized many former base buildings as government offices; some agencies, such as the Guam Department of Revenue and Taxation, have since moved elsewhere. Most of the original NAS housing facilities have been demolished to make room for airport-related commercial buildings. The original Chamorro-language toponym for the area, Tiyan ("belly"), has been restored and is in common use.

The closing of NAS Agana resulted in the opening of Central Avenue and Sunset Boulevard on the north side of the runways to the general public. This busy, but yet unnumbered highway offers a shortcut from Barrigada to Tamuning and Tumon, Guam's economic center.

Demographics
The U.S. Census Bureau includes the municipality in the Barrigada, and Barrigada Heights census-designated places.

Infrastructure and government

Government of Guam

The offices of the A.B. Won Pat International Airport Authority (GIAA) is located in the main passenger terminal, on the airport property and in Barrigada.

The Guam Environmental Protection Agency has its administrative headquarters and its operation building in Tiyan, as does the Guam Police Department.

U.S. federal government
The United States Postal Service operates the Barrigada Post Office, which is Guam's main post office and commonly known as "Guam Main Facility" (GMF).

The Federal Aviation Administration operates the Guam Air Route Traffic Control Center at 1775, Admiral Sherman Boulevard in Tiyan. The Guam ARTCC serves as the TRACON and en route control for the airspace within radar range of Guam.

The National Weather Service operates a Weather Forecast Office at 3232, Hueneme Road in Tiyan. This office provides services to Guam, the Commonwealth of the Northern Mariana Islands, and U.S.-affiliated Federated States of Micronesia.

Radio Barrigada, a military communications facility with properties operated by Naval Base Guam and Andersen Air Force Base is located mostly in Barrigada.

Economy
Fly Guam and Freedom Air have their headquarters in Building 17-80 in Tiyan, Barrigada.

Education

Primary and secondary schools
Guam Public School System serves the island. Two K-5 elementary schools (B.P. Carbullido Elementary School, Pedro C. Lujan Elementary School) and Luis P. Untalan Middle School are in Barrigada. Tiyan High School is in Barrigada. The school opened in August 2014. Historically George Washington High School in Mangilao has served the village.

The Protestant Harvest Christian Academy is located in Barrigada.

Public libraries
Guam Public Library System operates the Barrigada Library at 177 San Rogue Drive.

Government

Gallery

See also 

 Villages of Guam
 Barrigada LORAN-C transmitter

References

External links 

 Guampedia, Guam's Online Encyclopedia Barrigada Village